English riding is a form of horse riding seen throughout the world. There are many variations, but all feature a flat English saddle without the deep seat, high cantle or saddle horn that are part of a Western saddle nor the knee pads seen on an Australian Stock Saddle. Saddles within the various English disciplines are all designed to allow the horse the freedom to move in the optimal manner for a given task, ranging from classical dressage to horse racing. English bridles also vary in style based on discipline, but most feature some type of cavesson noseband as well as closed reins, buckled together at the ends, that prevents them from dropping on the ground if a rider becomes unseated. Clothing for riders in competition is usually based on traditional needs from which a specific style of riding developed, but most standards require, as a minimum, boots; breeches or jodhpurs; a shirt with some form of tie or stock; a hat, cap, or equestrian helmet; and a jacket.

English riding is an equestrian discipline with many different styles; however, at the most basic level, most versions require riders to use both hands on the reins, rather than just one hand, as is often seen in western riding. Riders generally "post" or "rise" to the trot (rising and sitting in rhythm with each stride). The "posting trot" is used most often in a working or extended trot, although there are also times when English riders may sit the trot; the "sitting trot" is most often used to ride collected forms of the trot seen in dressage, show hack and hunt seat equitation competition.

Types

English riding is promoted in organizations for youth, such as Pony Club, and is the basic style of riding seen in the various events at the Olympics. English saddles also are used by many pleasure riders for everyday riding.  The major subdivisions of the English riding genre are:

International
Forms of competition and exhibition seen throughout the world. The competitions include dressage, endurance, eventing, horse racing, horseball, polo, polocrosse, show jumping, and tent pegging.

North America

In the United States and Canada, there are two broad categories of English riding: Hunt seat, which is an overall term used in the United States to describe forward seat riding, used both on the flat and over fences. This is the style most commonly associated with the term "English" riding. The other major style is Saddle seat, a discipline created in North America to exhibit dramatic, high-stepping breeds of horses. Saddle seat style riding is seldom seen outside North America, though it has a small following in South Africa. In North America, dressage sometimes is loosely lumped into the "hunt seat" category by Saddle Seat and non-English riders, primarily to differentiate it from the Saddle Seat disciplines.

In addition to the international events listed in the previous section, the broad categories of English riding competition seen primarily within the United States and Canada are:

United Kingdom/Australia/New Zealand

"Show events" or Competition in the UK and Australia, in addition to the international events listed above, include other types of hack, riding, and equipment classes, such as:

In addition, most of these disciplines in all nations feature an equitation division in which riders are judged on their form and style. At some shows, a sidesaddle division is offered as well.

See also
Equestrianism
English saddle
Bridle
Horse show
United States Equestrian Federation
International Federation for Equestrian Sports
Equestrian helmet

References

Equestrianism
Horse showing and exhibition